"Jericho" is a song by American Contemporary Christian music singer-songwriter Andrew Ripp that was released via Boxer Poet on August 21, 2020, as the third single from his forthcoming studio album, Evergreen. Ripp co-wrote the song with Ethan Hulse.

"Jericho" became Ripp's debut entry on Billboard's US Hot Christian Songs chart, peaking at number four.

Background
On July 31, 2020, Louder Than the Music reported that Andrew Ripp would be releasing "Jericho" as a single from his forthcoming album, Evergreen, on August 21, 2020. Ripp shared the story behind the song, saying: 

"Jericho" impacted Christian radio stations in the United States on August 28, 2020.

Composition
"Jericho" is composed in the key of B♭ major with a tempo of 71 beats per minute.

Commercial performance
"Jericho" first appeared on the Christian Airplay chart, debuting at number 42 on the chart dated September 5, 2020. The song went reached a peak of number five on the December 12-dated chart, having charted for fifteen consecutive weeks on the chart.

"Jericho" made its debut at number 32 on Billboard's Hot Christian Songs chart dated September 26, 2020. The song broke through the top ten sector after spending eighteen consecutive weeks on the Hot Christian Songs chart, registering at number seven.

Music videos
The lyric video of "Jericho" was published on August 29, 2020, on Andrew Ripps's YouTube channel. The acoustic music video of the song was uploaded on January 10, 2021, on Andrew Ripp's YouTube channel.

Track listing

Charts

Weekly charts

Year-end charts

Release history

References

2020 singles
2020 songs
Contemporary Christian songs
Songs written by Andrew Ripp
Songs written by Ethan Hulse